Mark Fenner (born November 16, 1994) is an American curler from Bemidji, Minnesota. He is a two-time junior national champion and won his first United States Men's National Championship in 2021.

Curling career
In juniors, Fenner played second for skip Korey Dropkin, medalling four years in a row at the United States Junior Curling Championships.  This included two gold medals in 2013 and 2016. The team also consisted of Tom Howell at third and Alex Fenson at lead, except for the 2014–15 season when Andrew Stopera played lead. At the 2013 World Junior Curling Championships in Sochi, Russia, they finished in seventh place with a record of 4–5. At their second trip to the World Juniors in 2016, they found more success, finishing the round-robin in first place with a record of 8–1. In the 1 vs 2 page playoff game they lost to Bruce Mouat's Team Scotland, but they defeated Switzerland's Yannick Schwaller in the semifinal to face Scotland again in the championship game. Fenner and Team United States lost to Mouat again in the final, to finish with the silver medal.

Upon moving from juniors to men's, Fenner and Alex Fenson played as the front end for Pete Fenson for two seasons. Pete Fenson, Alex's father, is also an Olympian and seven-time national champion. During these two seasons, from 2016 to 2018, Dropkin and Howell played as the front end for Heath McCormick, but for the 2018–19 season Dropkin, Howell, Fenner, and Fenson reunited to compete together again. The next season Team Dropkin brought on Joe Polo, a highly experienced curler who was the alternate on the gold medal-winning team at the 2018 Winter Olympics, as a fifth teammate and experimented with various lineups throughout the season. The five-person team found success at the 2021 US Men's Championship, finishing the round-robin in first place with a 7–2 record. In the playoffs, Team Dropkin defeated Jed Brundidge's team in the 1 vs 2 page playoff game and then again in the final to secure their first Men's National Championship. Due to the COVID-19 pandemic, the 2021 Championship was conducted after the 2021 World Men's Championship so Team Dropkin will not represent the United States at World's, but they did secure a spot at the Olympic Trials in the fall of 2021.

Teams

Men's

Mixed doubles

References

External links

1994 births
Living people
People from Bemidji, Minnesota
American male curlers
American curling champions
Sportspeople from Minnesota